Ben Chapman may refer to:

 Benjamin Chapman (1621–?), soldier
 Sir Benjamin Chapman, 1st Baronet, of the Chapman baronets, MP for Westmeath and Fore
 Sir Benjamin Chapman, 4th Baronet (1810–1888), Irish Whig politician and barrister
 Ben Chapman (actor) (1928–2008), American actor
 Ben Chapman (baseball) (1908–1993), American baseball player
 Ben Chapman (footballer, born 1979), English football player
 Ben Chapman (footballer, born 1991), British Virgin Islands goalkeeper
 Ben Chapman (footballer, born 1998), English footballer
 Ben Chapman (politician) (born 1940), British Labour Member of Parliament

See also
Chapman (surname)